C24 is a secondary route in Namibia that runs from the southern outskirts of Rehoboth.

The C24 joins the B1 at its eastern terminus, south of Rehoboth. It terminates at the junction with D1261, near the Weavers Birds Nest Rest Area, in which the C24 becomes the M47.

References 

Roads in Namibia